Æthelstan Ætheling (Old English: Æþelstan Æþeling), early or mid 980s to 25 June 1014, was the eldest son of King Æthelred the Unready by his first wife Ælfgifu and the heir apparent to the kingdom until his death. He made his first appearance as a witness to a charter of his father in 993. He probably spent part of his childhood at Æthelingadene, Dean in west Sussex, and his paternal grandmother Ælfthryth may have played an important part in his upbringing. Almost nothing is known of his life, although he seems to have formed a friendship with Sigeforth and Morcar, two of the leading thegns of the Five Boroughs of the East Midlands.

In 1013 King Æthelred was forced into temporary exile in Normandy, and while it is not known what became of Æthelstan and his surviving full brothers, Edmund Ironside and Eadwig, during the reign of King Sweyn, they probably remained somewhere in England. Æthelstan's last appearance is in a charter dated 1013.

Æthelstan was a "warrior prince" and by his death he had accumulated a large collection of swords, prized war horses and combat equipment. In his will, copies of which still survive, and which was made on the day of his death, he left Edmund Ironside his most prized possession, a sword which had once belonged to Offa of Mercia, together with some of his estates and other pieces of his war gear. To his other full brother, Eadwig, he gave another piece from his large weapon collection, a silver-hilted sword. Much of his remaining land and wealth was divided between churches, friends and servants. He also made bequests to his sword-polisher and his stag huntsman.

While he mentions his father, grandmother and foster-mother in his will, his own mother and her soul are completely omitted. He also makes no mention of his stepmother or half-brothers, suggesting a division within the royal family at the time. He was buried at the Old Minster, Winchester, the first burial there of someone who was not king since Edward the Elder's brother, Æthelweard, in 922.

See also
Family tree of English monarchs#Houses of Wessex, Knýtlinga and Godwinson

References
Footnotes

Sources
Anglo-Saxon will: S 1503 (AD 1014)
Barlow, Frank. Edward the Confessor. Berkeley (CA), 1970
Simon Keynes, Æthelstan Ætheling, 2004, Oxford Online DNB
Pauline Stafford, Queen Emma & Queen Edith, Blackwell, 2001

External links
 
Translation of the will of Æthelstan Ætheling

980s births
1014 deaths
Year of birth uncertain
10th-century English people
11th-century English people
Anglo-Saxon royalty
House of Wessex
Sons of kings